Patricia Noxolo is a British geographer who is a professor at the University of Birmingham. She is the Chair of the Society for Caribbean Studies.

Early life and education 
Noxolo was born in Birmingham. She was an undergraduate student at the University of Manchester, where she studied French studies. She earned her doctorate at Nottingham Trent University, where she studied insecurity in Jamaican dancehall. She was a postdoctoral researcher at the University of Birmingham and the University of Leicester.

Research and career 
Noxolo was made a lecturer at the University of Birmingham in 2014. Her research considers postcolonial theories and cultural geography. In particular, she has focussed on British and Caribbean cultural practises. She led the Caribbean In/securities and Creativity (CARISCC) network, which was supported by Leverhulme Trust.

Noxolo was awarded the University of Birmingham teaching award in 2019. She was promoted to Professor in 2022, becoming one of very few Black professors in the United Kingdom.

Selected publications

References 

Living people
English geographers
Cultural geographers
Scientists from Birmingham, West Midlands
Academics of the University of Birmingham
Caribbean studies
Alumni of the University of Manchester
Alumni of Nottingham Trent University
Year of birth missing (living people)